Nicolaas Baur (12 September 1767 - 28 March 1820) was a Dutch artist.

Life

Baur was born at Harlingen in 1767, the son of the portrait painter  Hendricus Antonius Baur (1736–1817). He painted landscapes, views of cities, and moonlight and winter scenes; he was particularly  successful in marine subjects. He is considered one of the best of the later Dutch marine painters. He died at Harlingen in 1820.

Baur became a correspondent of the Royal Institute, predecessor to the Royal Netherlands Academy of Arts and Sciences in 1809.

References

Sources

External links

1767 births
1820 deaths
19th-century Dutch painters
Dutch male painters
Dutch marine artists
People from Harlingen, Netherlands
Frisian painters
Members of the Royal Netherlands Academy of Arts and Sciences
19th-century Dutch male artists